Manikas is a surname. Notable people with the surname include:

Antonis Manikas (born 1959), Greek football player and manager
Ilias Manikas (born 1980), Greek footballer
Stefanos Manikas (1952–2015), Greek politician

Greek-language surnames
Surnames